Karen Ann Marrongelle is an American mathematics educator specializing in collaborative learning in undergraduate-level mathematics education. Formerly the dean of the College of Liberal Arts and Sciences at Portland State University, in 2018 she became the head of the Directorate for Education and Human Resources at the National Science Foundation.

Education and career
Marrongelle attended Allentown Central Catholic High School in Allentown, Pennsylvania. She is a 1995 graduate of Albright College, where she majored in mathematics and also served on the executive board of Albright's radio station, WXAC. After earning a master's degree in mathematics at Lehigh University in 1997, she completed her doctorate in mathematics education at the University of New Hampshire. Her dissertation was Physics experiences and calculus: How students use physics to construct meaningful conceptualizations of calculus concepts in an interdisciplinary calculus/physics course.

In 2001, Marrongelle became a faculty member in the department of mathematics and statistics at Portland State University. She took a leave from Portland State to work at the National Science Foundation from 2007 to 2009. At Portland State, she was assistant vice chancellor for academic standards, vice chancellor for academic strategies, and interim dean of liberal arts and sciences. In 2015, she was appointed dean. As dean, she led a proposal to eliminate Portland State's language programs in Ancient Greek, Swahili, Korean and Vietnamese.

Publications and service
With Ping Li, Marrongelle is the author of the book Having Success with NSF: A Practical Guide (Wiley, 2013).

In 2015, Marongelle became one of the three founding editors-in-chief of the Springer mathematics education journal International Journal of Research in Undergraduate Mathematics Education, a post she held until 2019.

References

Year of birth missing (living people)
Living people
20th-century American mathematicians
21st-century American mathematicians
Allentown Central Catholic High School alumni
American women mathematicians
Mathematics educators
Albright College alumni
Lehigh University alumni
University of New Hampshire alumni
Portland State University faculty
20th-century American women
21st-century American women